Devendra Obi Banhart (born May 30, 1981) is an American-Venezuelan singer-songwriter and visual artist. Banhart was born in Texas, and raised in Venezuela and California. In 2000, he dropped out of the San Francisco Art Institute to pursue a musical career. In 2002, Banhart released his debut album and is best known for his albums in the late 2000's such as Cripple Crow and Smokey Rolls Down Thunder Canyon. He has since expanded his career to incorporate his interest and training in the visual arts.

Early life
Banhart was born in Houston, Texas to a Venezuelan mother, María Eugenia Rísquez, and an American father, Robert Gary Banhart. His given name is a synonym for Indra, suggested by Indian religious leader Prem Rawat (whom Banhart's parents followed), and his middle name Obi takes after Obi-Wan Kenobi, a Star Wars character.

His parents divorced in 1983, after which Rísquez and he moved to Caracas, Venezuela. Rísquez later remarried and when Banhart was 14, his stepfather moved the family to Los Angeles, California.

In 1998, Banhart began studying at the San Francisco Art Institute on a scholarship while living in The Castro, San Francisco's "gay" district, though he would often busk instead of attending class. He played his first musical show in a church at a gay wedding, performing Elvis Presley's "Love Me Tender" and the hymn "How Great Thou Art".

Musical Career 

Banhart dropped out of college in 2000 and left San Francisco after the dot-com bubble bust worsened the city's economy. That summer, he moved to Paris, France and began opening shows for indie rock bands such as Sonic Youth. Banhart returned to the United States that fall and played music in San Francisco and Los Angeles, until he was discovered by Michael Gira, owner of Young God Records, after Siobhan Duffy, Gira's wife, bought a copy of Banhart's demo CD The Charles C. Leary and gave it to Gira.

Banhart and Gira compiled an album from Banhart's recordings, and in 2002, Oh Me Oh My, which was made up of short fragments, was published by Young God Records and received favorable reviews. He recorded two other albums and an EP for the label: Rejoicing in the Hands, Niño Rojo, and The Black Babies; the releases had a simple acoustic sound. Banhart changed to XL Recordings in 2005 and released Cripple Crow, which was recorded in Bearsville Studios, New York and had a more elaborate sound.

Banhart's albums offer a variety of musical sounds, and he is often called the leader of the musical movement termed "Freak Folk." His lyrics are fantastical, idealistic, and poetic with the occasional trace of innuendos.

In 2005 Banhart collaborated with Antony and the Johnsons on the album I Am a Bird Now. He sings the introduction to the song "Spiraling" and plays guitar on "You Are My Sister" in which Boy George also appears.

Banhart was the first artist to design a T-shirt for the Yellow Bird Project, in 2006. He chose to donate the profits from the sale of his T-shirt to the Teenage Cancer Trust.

From 2007 to 2008, Banhart was romantically linked to actress Natalie Portman, who is featured in the video for Banhart's song "Carmensita".

He recorded his second album for XL Records, Smokey Rolls Down Thunder Canyon, at his home studio in Topanga, California. The album charted on the Billboard 200 at number 115. The album's song "Lover" was featured in the soundtrack of the movie Nick and Norah's Infinite Playlist, which included a cameo appearance by Banhart.

Banhart has performed at Carnegie Hall and the Hollywood Bowl opening for Gilberto Gil, as well as at Bonnaroo and Coachella music festivals. He founded a record label, Gnomonsong, with Andy Cabic of Vetiver, in 2005. In 2007, he signed with Neil Young's manager Elliot Roberts, who also contributed vocals to Smokey Rolls Down Thunder Canyon.

Banhart released an album in 2008 entitled Surfing, with Megapuss – a collaborative project with Gregory Rogove and Fabrizio Moretti of The Strokes and Little Joy.

In 2009, he signed to Warner/Reprise and released, What Will We Be. Later that year, at the band's request, he produced a remix of Oasis' "(Get Off Your) High Horse Lady". Along with "Neighbors", Banhart remixed the Phoenix song "Rome" from their 2009 album Wolfgang Amadeus Phoenix.

On September 4, 2009, Beck announced his second Record Club covers album, Songs of Leonard Cohen. Banhart contributed, alongside MGMT, Andrew Stockdale of Wolfmother and Binki Shapiro of Little Joy.

He is a collector of music artifacts. Banhart wrote the foreword for and appears in his friend Lauren Dukoff's book Family: Photographs by Lauren Dukoff. He has also written the introduction to a selection of poems by Kenneth Patchen.

On October 27, 2009, Banhart released What Will We Be, his first record on Warner/Reprise. Banhart and Jon Beasley, who were credited as art directors for the album's artwork and packaging, were nominated for a Grammy in 2011 for Best Recording Package.

The film Life During Wartime, directed by Todd Solondz, features a musical collaboration between Banhart and Beck. The song plays over the film's end credits. Banhart sings lead vocals while Beck adds backing vocals and also recorded the track. The lyrics were written by Solondz and the music by composer Marc Shaiman.

Banhart is an avid skateboarder, and in March 2010 broke a bone in his right leg while skating, only hours before a concert in Phoenix, resulting in the cancelation of future shows in Utah and Colorado.

In 2011, he collaborated with Marisa Monte and Rodrigo Amarante on a version of the song "Nú Com a Minha Música" for the Red Hot Organization's most recent charitable album Red Hot + Rio 2. The album is a follow-up to the 1996 Red Hot + Rio. Proceeds from the sales will be donated to raise awareness and money to fight AIDS/HIV and related health and social issues.

In April 2012, Banhart took place in artist Doug Aitken's audiovisual project "Song 1" at the Hirshhorn Museum in Washington, D.C. Banhart joined Beck and James Murphy of LCD Soundsystem in performing "I Only Have Eyes For You" for the project that uses eleven high-definition video projectors working in tandem to blanket the museum's entire surface with a video of the performance.

In July 2012, Banhart performed on The Eric Andre Show during the show's first season.

On December 3, 2012 Banhart announced his new album, Mala. The album was released on March 12, 2013, and was Banhart's debut album for Nonesuch.

In 2014, Banhart covered Arthur Russell's "Losing My Taste For The Nightlife" for the Red Hot + Arthur Russell compilation that benefitting the Red Hot Organizations fight against AIDS.

On May 14, 2016, Banhart curated a 2-day event at the Walker Art Center in Minneapolis, Minnesota, featuring performances from Harold Budd, Hecuba, Lucky Dragons, Jessica Pratt, Rodrigo Amarante, William Basinksi, and Helado Negro.

In 2015, Banhart scored the film Joshy, directed by Jeff Baena and starring Nick Kroll, Jenny Slate, and Thomas Middleditch.

In June 2016, Banhart released the first track of his ninth studio album, Ape in Pink Marble, titled "Middle Names". In August 2016, Banhart released the second track of his ninth studio album, titled "Saturday Night". His ninth studio album, Ape in Pink Marble was released on September 23, 2016 on Nonesuch Records.

In 2018 Banhart sang on Ssion's album O, lending vocals to the track "Free Lunch".

In September 2018 Banhart participated in the project 27: The Most Perfect Album, which was born out of the podcast More Perfect, a Radiolab spinoff. The project celebrated the 27 amendments of the US Constitution.

His tenth studio album, Ma, was released on September 13, 2019 on Nonesuch Records. Helado Negro remixed the track "Love Song" which was released on January 16, 2020.

In April 2020 he was featured on a Mykki Blanco track titled "You Will Find It" 

In 2020, Banhart - along with Noah Georgeson - scored the film Arkansas, directed by Clark Duke and starring John Malkovich and Liam Hemsworth.

On February 5, 2020, Banhart contributed to a 50th anniversary tribute album honoring Allen Ginsberg's Fall of America. Other artists featured included Mickey Hart, Yo La Tengo, Thurston Moore and Lee Renaldo. Banhart provided music and score to the poem "Milarepa Taste".

On September 3, 2020, Banhart released a cover of the Grateful Dead's "Franklin's Tower" as part of Amazon's Amazon Originals series. The song has since been widely released.

Banhart has cited Vashti Bunyan, Simón Díaz, Nusrat Fateh Ali Khan, Arthur Russell, Ali Farka Touré, and Caetano Veloso as his main influences.

Critical Reception
Banhart's music is often referred to as psychedelic folk, freak folk and New Weird America, and is associated with acts such as singer-songwriter Joanna Newsom, musical group CocoRosie, and contemporary folk band Vetiver. The New York Times has called his work "free associative work" and SPIN magazine has described it as "ashram-appropriate guitar strums" and "trippy-hippie tone poetry." Critics have compared Banhart's style to that of 1970s band Tyrannosaurus Rex, an early version of British rock musician Marc Bolan's T. Rex, though in a 2004 interview Banhart stated that he was unaware of Tyrannosaurus Rex until after he began writing and recording music.

Visual art and other media
Drawings by Banhart were featured in the San Francisco Museum of Modern Art and in the Centre for Fine Arts, Brussels.

Banhart's drawings have also been featured in the Art Basel Contemporary Art Fair in Miami, Florida, the Mazzoli Gallery in Modena, Italy, Spain's ARCOmadrid. and the Andrew Roth Gallery in New York.

His drawings were featured in MOCA's exhibit "The Artist's Museum", in which the works of influential Los Angeles based artists from the last 30 years were presented. As part of the exhibition Banhart collaborated with artist Doug Aitken and musicians Beck and Caetano Veloso for a musical and visual performance piece.

Banhart was a participant in Yoko Ono's second Water Piece project.

He read Joan Miró's poem "A Star Caresses the Breasts of a Negress" for the recorded guided tour of Tate Modern.

In May 2015, Anteism published a collaborative book with Banhart and artist Adam Tullie titled Unburdened By Meaning.

In June 2015, Banhart released a collection of drawings, paintings, and mixed media pieces, titled I Left My Noodle on Ramen Street, published by Prestel Publishing.

In 2016, Banhart made a small cameo in the feature film Adam Green's Aladdin.

In November 2018, Banhart curated part of the program for the Dutch Le Guess Who? festival.

On April 23, 2019, Featherproof published Banhart's first book of poetry titled Weeping Gang Bliss Void Yab-Yum.

On May 8, 2019 Banhart announced a collaborative collection of linen clothing with designer Alex Crane titled "Almas".

In September 2019, Anteism published a book of drawings titled Vanishing Wave. The drawings were originally sold to benefit the victims of the Tohoku earthquake in Fukushima.

On December 14 and 15, 2019, Banhart curated a two-day event at Hauser and Wirth Los Angeles titled Other Flowers. The event featured his photography, paintings, a pop up store with limited edition merchandise, as well as series of performances featuring musicians Rodrigo Amarante, Tim Presley, and Banhart himself. It also included performance art from Jasmine Albuquerque and Friends, Invisible Women, and Nao Bustamante.

In March 2020, Banhart had his first solo art show in Los Angeles at Nicodim Gallery. The show was titled The Grief I Have Caused You and featured his first series of oil paintings as well as drawings from 2019-2020.

Band
Banhart's live band has had multiple names, including Spiritual Bonerz (the 'z' is silent) and The Grogs.
Devendra Banhart – vocals, guitar, organ, synthesizers, samba, and more
Rodrigo Amarante – guitar, bass, backing vocals, synthesizer
Noah Georgeson – guitar, multiple instruments, producer
Gregory Rogove – drummer, backing vocals
Josiah Steinbrick – bass, multiple instruments
Todd Dahlhoff – bass, backing vocals
H. Hawkline – guitar (2017 Ape in Pink Marble tour)
Tim Presley (2017 Ape in Pink Marble tour)
Luckey Remington (2017 Ape in Pink Marble tour)
Occasionally:
Andy Cabic (From Vetiver) – guitar
Fabrizio Moretti (From The Strokes) – drummer
Michael Gira (From Swans) – harmonica, vocals, producer

Discography

Albums

Singles and EPs
The Black Babies (2003)
Sight To Behold/Be Kind (2004)
Little Yellow Spider (2004)
At The Hop (2004)
I Feel Just Like A Child (2005)
Heard Somebody Say (2005)
Chinese Children (2005)
Xiu Xiu/Devendra Banhart split 7-inch (2005)
White Reggae Troll (2006)
Carmensita (2007)
Lover (2007)
Baby (2009)
16th & Valencia Roxy Music (2009)
Foolin''' (2010)Something French/Loring Baker' (2014)Middle Names (2016)Fig in Leather (2017)
 Vast Ovoid (2020)

Collaborations and compilationsThe Golden Apples of the Sun (2004)Jana Hunter / Devendra Banhart (with Jana Hunter, 2005)Love Above All (2007)Xiu Xiu's Remixed & Covered (2007)Surfing (as Megapuss with Gregory Rogove, 2008)Songs of Leonard Cohen – Beck's Record Club (2009)
 Loving Takes This Course – A Tribute to the Songs of Kath Bloom (2009)
 Amador – You're The One with Adanowsky (2010)Mujer Divina – Homenaje a Agustín Lara – Amor, amor de mis amores with Natalia Lafourcade (2012)
"Time" with Stray Dogg (2012)Someday with Akira Kosemura (2017)A Kind of Love Song with Shuta Hasunuma & U-Zhaan (2018)Refuge'' with Noah Georgeson (2021)

References

External links

1981 births
American folk singers
Hispanic and Latino American musicians
Living people
New Weird America
Musicians from Houston
Psychedelic folk musicians
San Francisco Art Institute alumni
Spanish-language singers of the United States
American people of Venezuelan descent
XL Recordings artists
American folk rock musicians
Freak folk
Young God Records artists
Indie folk musicians
21st-century American male singers
21st-century American singers
Love Da Records artists